Policki Nurt is a branch of the river Oder in the town Police, northwestern Poland.

0Policki Nurt
Rivers of Poland
Rivers of West Pomeranian Voivodeship